Jawahar Navodaya Vidyalaya, Khawzawl or locally known as JNV Khawzawl is a boarding, co-educational  school in Khawzawl district of Mizoram state in India. Navodaya Vidyalayas are funded by the Indian Ministry of Human Resources Development and administered  by Navodaya Vidyalaya Smiti, an autonomous body under the ministry.

History 
The school was established in 2006, and is a part of Jawahar Navodaya Vidyalaya schools. This school is administered and monitored by Shillong regional office of Navodaya Vidyalaya Smiti.

Admission 
Admission to JNV Khawzawl at class VI level is made through selection test conducted by Navodaya Vidyalaya Smiti. The information about test is disseminated and advertised in district by the office of Khawzawl district magistrate (Collector), who is also chairperson of Vidyalya Management Committee.

Affiliations 
JNV Khawzawl is affiliated to Central Board of Secondary Education with affiliation number 2340005.

See also 

 List of JNV schools

References

External links 

 Official Website of JNV Champhai

High schools and secondary schools in Mizoram
Champhai
Educational institutions established in 2006
2006 establishments in Mizoram